Don Adams (7 June 1942 – 27 November 1995) was a Scottish-born rhythm and blues singer from Glasgow who moved to Munich in the 1960s to perform in a production of the musical Hair.

While in Munich, Adams recorded two albums, Watts Happening (1969) and The Black Voice (1972), with his backing group of German jazz musicians on the United Artists Records label. He was a member of Love Generation and then Les Humphries Singers.

Death
He died of cirrhosis in London in 1995.

References

1942 births
1995 deaths
Musicians from Glasgow
20th-century Scottish male singers
Les Humphries Singers members
Deaths from cirrhosis
Alcohol-related deaths in England